"Life Is a Game of Changing" is a song by Australian rock band DMA's. It was released on 31 January 2020. as the second single from their third studio album, The Glow.

The song was the band's second single to chart (and their first to chart internationally), peaking at 99 in Scotland.

The song was nominated for Best Single at the 2021 Rolling Stone Australia Awards.

Track listings

Charts

References

External links 
 

2020 singles
2020 songs
DMA's songs